Georges Dantu (10 April 1867 – 23 April 1948) was a French painter. His work was part of the painting event in the art competition at the 1932 Summer Olympics.

References

1867 births
1948 deaths
20th-century French painters
20th-century French male artists
French male painters
Olympic competitors in art competitions
Painters from Paris
19th-century French male artists